Douglin is a surname. Notable people with the surname include:

Denis Douglin (born 1988), American boxer
Rawle Douglin, Trinidad and Tobago Anglican bishop
Troy Douglin (born 1982), English footballer